Atagema tristis is a species of sea slug or dorid nudibranch, a marine gastropod mollusc in the family Discodorididae.

Distribution
This species was described from India.

References

Discodorididae
Gastropods described in 1864